Sideways to New Italy is the second studio album by Australian indie rock band Rolling Blackouts Coastal Fever. It was released on 5 June 2020 under Sub Pop.

Critical reception

Sideways to New Italy was met with universal acclaim through critics' reviews. At Metacritic, which assigns a weighted average rating out of 100 to reviews from mainstream publications, this release received an average score of 80, based on 17 reviews.

Accolades

Track listing

Charts

References

2020 albums
Rolling Blackouts Coastal Fever albums
Sub Pop albums